Bioelectromagnetics, also known as bioelectromagnetism, is the study of the interaction between electromagnetic fields and biological entities. Areas of study include electromagnetic fields produced by living cells, tissues or organisms, the effects of man-made sources of electromagnetic fields like mobile phones, and the application of electromagnetic radiation toward therapies for the treatment of various conditions.

Biological phenomena

Bioelectromagnetism is studied primarily through the techniques of electrophysiology. In the late eighteenth century, the Italian physician and physicist Luigi Galvani first recorded the phenomenon while dissecting a frog at a table where he had been conducting experiments with static electricity. Galvani coined the term animal electricity to describe the phenomenon, while contemporaries labeled it galvanism. Galvani and contemporaries regarded muscle activation as resulting from an electrical fluid or substance in the nerves. Short-lived electrical events called action potentials occur in several types of animal cells which are called excitable cells, a category of cell include neurons, muscle cells, and endocrine cells, as well as in some plant cells. These action potentials are used to facilitate inter-cellular communication and activate intracellular processes. The physiological phenomena of action potentials are possible because voltage-gated ion channels allow the resting potential caused by electrochemical gradient on either side of a cell membrane to resolve..

Several animals are suspected to have the ability to sense electromagnetic fields; for example, several aquatic animals have structures potentially capable of sensing changes in voltage caused by a changing magnetic field, while migratory birds are thought to use magnetoreception in navigation.

Bioeffects of electromagnetic radiation
Most of the molecules in the human body interact weakly with electromagnetic fields in the radio frequency or extremely low frequency bands. One such interaction is absorption of energy from the fields, which can cause tissue to heat up; more intense fields will produce greater heating. This can lead to biological effects ranging from muscle relaxation (as produced by a diathermy device) to burns. Many nations and regulatory bodies like the International Commission on Non-Ionizing Radiation Protection have established safety guidelines to limit EMF exposure to a non-thermal level. This can be defined as either heating only to the point where the excess heat can be dissipated, or as a fixed increase in temperature not detectable with current instruments like 0.1 °C. However, biological effects have been shown to be present for these non-thermal exposures; Various mechanisms have been proposed to explain these, and there may be several mechanisms  underlying the differing phenomena observed.

Many behavioral effects at different intensities have been reported from exposure to magnetic fields, particularly with pulsed magnetic fields. The specific pulseform used appears to be an important factor for the behavioural effect seen; for example, a pulsed magnetic field originally designed for spectroscopic MRI, referred to as Low Field Magnetic Stimulation, was found to temporarily improve patient-reported mood in bipolar patients, while another MRI pulse had no effect. A whole-body exposure to a pulsed magnetic field was found to alter standing balance and pain perception in other studies.

A strong changing magnetic field can induce electrical currents in conductive tissue such as the brain. Since the magnetic field penetrates tissue, it can be generated outside of the head to induce currents within, causing transcranial magnetic stimulation (TMS). These currents depolarize neurons in a selected part of the brain, leading to changes in the patterns of neural activity. In repeated pulse TMS therapy or rTMS, the presence of incompatible EEG electrodes can result in electrode heating and, in severe cases, skin burns. A number of scientists and clinicians are attempting to use TMS to replace electroconvulsive therapy (ECT) to treat disorders such as severe depression and hallucinations. Instead of one strong electric shock through the head as in ECT, a large number of relatively weak pulses are delivered in TMS therapy, typically at the rate of about 10 pulses per second. If very strong pulses at a rapid rate are delivered to the brain, the induced currents can cause convulsions much like in the original electroconvulsive therapy. Sometimes, this is done deliberately in order to treat depression, such as in ECT.

Effects of electromagnetic radiation on human health
While health effects from extremely low frequency (ELF) electric and magnetic fields (0 to 300 Hz) generated by power lines, and radio/microwave frequencies (RF) (10 MHz - 300 GHz) emitted by radio antennas and wireless networks have been well studied, the intermediate range (IR) (300 Hz to 10 MHz) has been studied far less. Direct effects of low power radiofrequency electromagnetism on human health have been difficult to prove, and documented life-threatening effects from radiofrequency electromagnetic fields are limited to high power sources capable of causing significant thermal effects and medical devices such as pacemakers and other electronic implants. However, many studies have been conducted with electromagnetic fields to investigate their effects on cell metabolism, apoptosis, and tumor growth.

Electromagnetic radiation in the intermediate frequency range has found a place in modern medical practice for the treatment of bone healing and for nerve stimulation and regeneration. It is also approved as cancer therapy in form of Tumor Treating Fields, using alternating electric fields in the frequency range of 100–300 kHz. Since some of these methods involve magnetic fields that invoke electric currents in biological tissues and others only involve electric fields, they are strictly speaking electrotherapies albeit their application modi with modern electronic equipment have placed them in the category of bioelectromagnetic interactions.

See also 

Bioelectrogenesis
Biomagnetism
Bioelectricity
Bioelectrochemistry
Bioelectrodynamics
Biophotonics
Biophysics
Electric fish
Electrical brain stimulation
Electroencephalography
Electromagnetic radiation and health
Electromyography
Electrotaxis
Kirlian photography
Magnetobiology
Magnetoception 
Magnetoelectrochemistry
Mobile phone radiation and health
Radiobiology
Specific absorption rate
Transcutaneous electrical nerve stimulation

Notes

References

Organizations 
 The Bioelectromagnetics Society (BEMS)
 European BioElectromagnetics Association (EBEA)
 Society for Physical Regulation in Biology and Medicine (SPRBM) (formerly the Bioelectrical Repair and Growth Society, BRAGS)
 International Society for Bioelectromagnetism (ISBEM)
 The Bioelectromagnetics Lab at University College Cork, Ireland
 Institute of Bioelectromagnetism
 Vanderbilt University, Living State Physics Group, archived page
 Ragnar Granit Institute.
 Institute of Photonics and Electronics AS CR, Department of Bioelectrodynamics.

Books 
 Becker, Robert O.; Andrew A. Marino, Electromagnetism and Life, State University of New York Press, Albany, 1982. .
 Becker, Robert O.; The Body Electric: Electromagnetism and the Foundation of Life, William Morrow & Co, 1985. .
 Becker, Robert O.; Cross Currents: The Promise of Electromedicine, the Perils of Electropollution, Tarcher, 1989. .
 Binhi, V.N., Magnetobiology: Underlying Physical Problems. San Diego: Academic Press, 2002. .
 Brodeur Paul; Currents of Death, Simon & Schuster, 2000. . 
 Carpenter, David O.; Sinerik Ayrapetyan, Biological Effects of Electric and Magnetic Fields, Volume 1 : Sources and Mechanisms, Academic Press, 1994. .
 Carpenter, David O.;  Sinerik Ayrapetyan, Biological Effects of Electric and Magnetic Fields : Beneficial and Harmful Effects (Vol 2), Academic Press, 1994. .
 Chiabrera A. (Editor), Interactions Between Electromagnetic Fields and Cells, Springer, 1985. .
 Habash, Riadh W. Y.; Electromagnetic Fields and Radiation: Human Bioeffects and Safety, Marcel Dekker, 2001. .
 Horton William F.; Saul Goldberg, Power Frequency Magnetic Fields and Public Health, CRC Press, 1995. .
 Mae-Wan, Ho; et al., Bioelectrodynamics and Biocommunication, World Scientific, 1994. .
 Malmivuo, Jaakko; Robert Plonsey, Bioelectromagnetism: Principles and Applications of Bioelectric and Biomagnetic Fields, Oxford University Press, 1995. .
 O'Connor, Mary E. (Editor), et al., Emerging Electromagnetic Medicine, Springer, 1990. .

Journals 
 Bioelectromagnetics
 Bioelectrochemistry
 European Biophysics Journal
 International Journal of Bioelectromagnetism, ISBEM, 1999–present,
 BioMagnetic Research and Technology archive (no longer publishing)
 Biophysics, English version of the Russian "Biofizika"
 Radiatsionnaya Bioliogiya Radioecologia ("Radiation Biology and Radioecology", in Russian)

External links
 A brief history of Bioelectromagnetism, by Jaakko and Plonsey. 
 Direct and Inverse Bioelectric Field Problems
Human body meshes for MATLAB, Ansoft/ANSYS HFSS, Octave (surface meshes from real subjects, meshes for Visible Human Project)

 
Physiology
Radiobiology
Biology
Electrophysiology

ru:Магнитобиология